Kaohsiung City Constituency II includes districts in the northwestern part of Kaohsiung. The district was formerly known as Kaohsiung County Constituency II (2008-2010) and was created in 2008, when all local constituencies of the Legislative Yuan were reorganized to become single-member districts.  It has been represented by Chiu Chih-wei since 2012.

Current district
 Qieding
 Hunei
 Lujhu
 Yong'an
 Gangshan
 Mituo
 Zihguan
 Ciaotou

Legislators

Electoral Results

2008 
 All registered: 242,349
 Voters (turnout): 156,440（64.55%）
 Valid (percentage): 153,166（97.91%）
 Rejected (percentage): 3,274（2.09%）

2012 
 All registered: 249,535
 Voters (turnout): 194,515（77.95%）
 Valid (percentage): 192,021（98.72%）
 Rejected (percentage): 2,494（1.28%）

2016 
 All registered: 256,424
 Voters (turnout): 178,539（69.63%）
 Valid (percentage): 175,247（98.16%）
 Rejected (percentage): 3,292（1.84%）

2008 establishments in Taiwan
Constituencies in Kaohsiung